This is an alphabetical list of school districts in Missouri, sorted first by the state supervisors of instruction regions, the counties each region serves, and then alphabetically. 

Many districts have the letters "C" or "R" in their name, followed by a numeral. These stand for "consolidated" (merged through consent of voters) and "reorganized" (merged by the state), respectively, with number indicating the historical order of the merger.

Region A: St. Louis Region

Jefferson County

 Crystal City 47 School District
 DeSoto 73 School District
 Dunklin R-V School District
 Festus R-VI School District
 Fox C-6 Consolidated School District
 Grandview R-2 School District
 Hillsboro R-3 School District
 Jefferson County R-7 School District
 Northwest R-I School District
 Sunrise R-9 School District
 Windsor C-1 School District

St. Charles County

 Francis Howell R-III School District
 Fort Zumwalt R-II School District
 Orchard Farm R-V School District
 St. Charles R-VI School District
 Wentzville R-IV School District

St. Louis City
 St. Louis City Public Schools

St. Louis County

 Affton 101 School District
 Bayless School District
 Brentwood School District
 Clayton School District
 Ferguson-Florissant R-II School District
 Hancock Place School District
 Hazelwood School District
 Jennings School District
 Kirkwood R-7 School District
 Ladue School District
 Lindbergh School District
 Maplewood-Richmond Heights School District
 Mehlville R-IX School District
 Normandy School Collaborative
 Parkway C-2 School District
 Pattonville R-III School District
 Ritenour School District 
 Riverview Gardens School District
 Rockwood R-VI School District
 Special School District St. Louis County
 University City School District
 Valley Park School District
 Webster Groves School District

Region B: Kansas City Region

Cass County

 Archie R-V School District (also extends into Bates County)
 Belton 124 School District 
 Drexel R-IV School District 
 East Lynne 40 School District
 Harrisonville R-IX School District
 Midway R-I School District
 Pleasant Hill R-3 School District
 Raymore-Peculiar R-II School District 
 Sherwood Cass R-VIII School District
 Strasburg C-3 School District

Clay County

 Excelsior Springs 40 School District
 Kearney R-1 School District
 Liberty 53 School District
 Missouri City 56 School District
 North Kansas City 74 School District
 Smithville R-II School District

Jackson County

 Blue Springs R-IV School District
 Center 58 School District
 Fort Osage R-1 School District
 Grain Valley R-V School District
 Grandview C-4 School District
 Hickman Mills C-1 School District
 Independence 30 School District
 Kansas City 33 School District
 Lee's Summit R-VII School District
 Lone Jack C-6 School District
 Oak Grove R-VI School District (Also extends into Lafayette County)
 Raytown C-2 School District

Platte County

 North Platte County R-I School District (Also extends into Buchanan County)
 Park Hill School District
 Platte County R-III School District
 West Platte County R-II School District

Region C: Southwest Region

Barry County

 Cassville R-IV School District
 Exeter R-VI School District
 Monett R-I School District (also extends into Lawrence County)
 Purdy R-II School District
 Shell Knob 78 School District
 Southwest R-V School District
 Wheaton R-III School District

Barton County

 Golden City R-III School District
 Lamar R-I School District
 Liberal R-II School District

Cedar County

 El Dorado Springs R-II School District 
 Stockton R-1 School District

Christian County

 Billings R-IV School District (also extends into Stone County)
 Chadwick R-I School District
 Clever R-V School District (also extends into Stone County)
 Nixa Public Schools
 Ozark R-6 School District
 Sparta R-III School District
 Spokane R-VII School District

Dade County

 Dadeville R-II School District
 Everton R-III School District
 Greenfield R-IV School District
 Lockwood R-I School District

Dallas County
 Dallas R-I County School District

Douglas County

 Ava R-I School District (also extends into Christian, Ozark, and Wright Counties)
 Plainview R-VIII School District
 Skyline R-II School District

Greene County

 Ash Grove R-IV School District
 Fair Grove R-X School District
 Logan-Rogersville R-VIII School District (also extends into Webster County)
 Republic R-III School District
 Springfield R-XII School District
 Strafford R-VI School District
 Walnut Grove R-V School District
 Willard R-II School District

Jasper County

 Avilla R-13 School District
 Carl Junction R-1 School District (also extends into Newton County)
 Carthage R-IX School District
 Jasper County R-V School District (also extends into Barton County)
 Joplin Schools
 Sarcoxie R-II School District
 Webb City R-7 School District

Laclede County

 Gasconade C-4 School District
 Laclede County C-5 School District
 Laclede County R-I School District
 Lebanon R-3 School District

Lawrence County

 Aurora R-VIII School District
 Marionville R-IX School District
 Miller R-II School District
 Mount Vernon R-V School District
 Pierce City R-VI School District
 Verona R-VII School District

McDonald County
 McDonald County R-I School District

Newton County

 Diamond R-IV School District
 East Newton County R-VI School District
 Neosho School District
 Seneca R-VII School District
 Westview C-6 School District

Ozark County

 Bakersfield R-IV School District (also extends into Howell County)
 Dora R-III School District (also extends into Douglas County)
 Gainesville School District
 Lutie R-VI School District
 Thornfield R-I School District

Polk County

 Bolivar R-I School District
 Fair Play R-II School District
 Halfway R-III School District
 Humansville R-IV School District
 Marion C. Early R-V School District
 Pleasant Hope R-VI School District

Stone County

 Blue Eye R-V School District
 Crane R-III School District (also extends into Barry County)
 Galena R-2 School District
 Hurley R-I School District
 Reeds Spring R-IV School District

Taney County

 Bradleyville R-I School District (also extends into Christian, Douglas and Ozark Counties)
 Branson R-IV School District
 Forsyth R-III School District
 Hollister R-V School District (also extends into Stone County)
 Kirbyville R-VI School District
 Mark Twain R-VIII School District
 Taneyville R-II School District

Vernon County

 Bronaugh R-VII School District
 Nevada R-V School District
 Northeast Vernon County R-I School District 
 Sheldon R-VIII School District

Webster County

 Fordland R-III School District
 Marshfield R-I School District
 Niangua R-V School District
 Seymour R-II School District

Wright County

 Hartville R-II School District
 Manes R-V School District
 Mansfield R-IV School District
 Mountain Grove R-III School District
 Norwood R-I School District (also extends into Douglas County)

Region D: Central Region

Audrain County

 Community R-VI School District (also extends into Montgomery and Ralls Counties)
 Mexico 59 Public Schools 
 Van-Far R-I School District

Boone County

 Centralia R-VI School District (also extends into Audrain and Monroe Counties)
 Columbia 78 School District
 Hallsville R-IV School District
 Harrisburg R-VIII School District
 Southern Boone Co. R-I School District
 Sturgeon School District

Callaway County

 Fulton 58 School District
 New Bloomfield R-III School District
 North Callaway County R-I School District
 South Callaway R-II School District

Camden County

 Camdenton R-III School District (also extends into Dallas, Laclede and Morgan Counties)
 Climax Springs R-IV School District (also extends into Benton, Hickory, and Morgan Counties)
 Macks Creek R-V School District 
 Stoutland R-II School District

Cole County

 Blair Oaks R-II School District
 Cole County R-I School District (also extends into Moniteau County)
 Cole County R-V School District (also extends into Miller County)
 Jefferson City Public Schools (also extends into Callaway County)

Cooper County

 Blackwater R-II School District (also extends into Saline County)
 Boonville R-I School District
 Cooper County R-IV School District
 Otterville R-VI School District
 Pilot Grove C-4 School District
 Prairie Home R-5 School Distric

Gasconade County

 Gasconade County R-I School District
 Gasconade County R-II School District

Howard County

 Fayette R-III School District
 Glasgow School District
 New Franklin R-1 School District

Lincoln County

 Elsberry R-II School District
 Silex R-I School District
 Troy R-III School District
 Winfield R-IV School District

Miller County

 Eldon R-1 School District 
 Iberia R-V School District
 Miller County R-III School District
 School of the Osage School District
 St. Elizabeth R-IV School District

Moniteau County

 Clarksburg C-2 School District (also extends into Cooper County)
 High Point R-III School District
 Jamestown C-1 School District
 Moniteau County R-I School District
 Moniteau County R-V School District
 Tipton R-VI School District

Montgomery County

 Montgomery County R-II School District
 Wellsville Middletown R-I School District

Morgan County

 Morgan County R-I School District
 Morgan County R-II School District

Osage County

 Osage Co. R-I School District
 Osage Co. R-II School District 
 Osage Co. R-III School District

Warren County

 Warren County R-III School District (also extends into Montgomery County)
 Wright City R-II School District

Region E: Southeast Region

Bollinger County

 Leopold R-III School District
 Meadow Heights R-II School District
 Woodland R-IV School District
 Zalma R-V School District

Butler County

 Neelyville R-IV School District
 Poplar Bluff R-1 School District 
 Twin Rivers R-X School District

Cape Girardeau County

 Cape Girardeau 63 School District
 Delta R-5 School District
 Jackson R-2 School District
 Nell Holcomb R-IV School District
 Oak Ridge R-VI School District

Carter County

 East Carter County R-II School District
 Van Buren R-1 School District

Dunklin County

 Campbell R-II School District
 Clarkton C-4 School District
 Holcomb R-III School District
 Kennett 39 School District
 Malden R-I School District
 Senath-Hornersville C-8 School District
 Southland C-9 School District

Madison County

 Fredericktown R-1 School District
 Marquand-Zion R-VI School District

Mississippi County

 Charleston R-I School District
 East Prairie R-II School District

New Madrid County

 Gideon 37 School District 
 New Madrid County R-I School District
 Portageville School District 
 Risco R-II School District

Pemiscot County

 Caruthersville 18 School District
 Cooter R-IV School District
 Delta C-7 School District
 Hayti R-II School District
 North Pemiscot County R-I School District
 Pemiscot County R-III School District
 Pemiscot County Special School District 
 South Pemiscot Co. R-V School District

Perry County

 Altenburg 48 School District
 Perry County 32 School District

Ripley County

 Doniphan R-I School District
 Naylor R-II School District
 Ripley Co. R-IV School District 
 Ripley County R-III School District

St. Francois County

 Bismarck R-V School District
 Central R-III School District (also extends into Ste. Genevieve County)
 Farmington R-XII School District
 North Saint Francois County R-1 School District
 West Saint Francois County R-IV School District (also extends into Washington County)

Ste. Genevieve County
 Ste. Genevieve County R-II School District

Scott County

 Chaffee R-II School District
 Kelso C-7 School District
 Oran R-III School District
 Scott City R-I School District
 Scott Co. R-IV School District
 Scott County Central School District
 Sikeston R-6 School District

Stoddard County

 Advance R-IV School District (also extends into Bollinger County)
 Bell City R-II School District
 Bernie R-XIII School District (also extends into Dunklin County)
 Bloomfield R-XIV School District
 Dexter R-XI School District
 Puxico R-VIII School District
 Richland R-I School District

Wayne County
 Clearwater R-I School District (also extends into Madison and Reynolds Counties)
 Greenville R-II School District

Region F: West Central Region

Bates County

 Adrian R-II School District
 Ballard R-II School District
 Butler R-V School District
 Hudson R-IX School District
 Hume R-VIII School District 
 Miami R-I School District
 Rich Hill R-IV School District

Benton County

 Cole Camp R-I School District (also extends into Pettis County)
 Lincoln R-2 School District
 Warsaw R-IX School District

Carroll County

 Bosworth R-V School District
 Carrollton R-VII School District
 Hale R-I School District 
 Norborne R-VIII School District
 Tina-Avalon R-II School District

Henry County

 Calhoun R-VIII School District
 Clinton School District
 Davis R-XII School District
 Henry County R-I School District
 Leesville R-IX School District
 Montrose R-XIV School District
 Shawnee R-III School District

Hickory County

 Hermitage R-IV School District
 Hickory County R-I School District
 Weaubleau R-III School District
 Wheatland R-II School District

Johnson County

 Chilhowee R-IV School District (also extends into Henry County)
 Holden R-III School District
 Johnson Co. R-VII School District
 Kingsville R-I School District
 Knob Noster R-8 School District
 Leeton R-X School District
 Warrensburg R-VI School District

Lafayette County

 Concordia R-II School District (also extends into Johnson County)
 Lafayette County C-1 School District
 Lexington R-V School District
 Odessa R-VII School District (also extends into Johnson County)
 Santa Fe R-X School District
 Wellington-Napoleon R-IX School District

Pettis County

 Green Ridge R-VIII School District
 La Monte R-IV School District
 Pettis County R-V School District
 Pettis County R-XII School District
 Sedalia 200 School District
 Smithton R-VI School District

Ray County

 Hardin-Central C-2 School District
 Lawson R-XIV School District
 Orrick R-XI School District
 Richmond R-XVI School District

St. Clair County

 Appleton City R-II School District
 Lakeland R-III School District
 Osceola School District
 Roscoe C-1 School District

Saline County

 Gilliam C-4 School District
 Hardeman R-X School District
 Malta Bend R-V School District
 Marshall School District
 Miami R-I Elem. School District
 Orearville R-IV School District
 Slater School District
 Sweet Springs R-VII School District

Region G: South Central Region

Crawford County

 Crawford County R-I School District (also extends into Washington County)
 Crawford County R-II School District
 Steelville R-III School District

Dent County

 Dent-Phelps R-III School District
 Green Forest R-II School District
 North Wood R-IV School District
 Oak Hill R-I School District
 Salem R-80 School District

Franklin County

 Franklin Co. R-II School District 
 Lonedell R-XIV School District
 Meramec Valley R-III School District
 New Haven School District
 Spring Bluff R-XV School District
 St. Clair R-XIII School District
 Strain Japan R-16 School District
 Sullivan School District (Also extends into Crawford County)
 Union R-XI School District
 Washington School District (also extends into St. Charles and Warren Counties)

Howell County

 Fairview R-XI School District
 Glenwood R-VIII School District 
 Howell Valley R-I School District
 Junction Hill C-12 School District
 Mountain View-Birch Tree R-III School District
 Richards R-V School District
 West Plains R-7 School District
 Willow Springs R-IV School District

Iron County

 Arcadia Valley R-II School District (also extends into Madison County)
 Belleview R-III School District
 Iron County C-4 School District (also extend into Crawford and Washington Counties)
 South Iron R-I School District

Maries County

 Maries County R-I School District
 Maries County R-II School District

Oregon County

 Alton R-IV School District 
 Couch R-I School District
 Oregon-Howell R-III School District
 Thayer R-II School District

Phelps County

 Newburg R-2 School District
 Phelps County R-3 School District (also extends into Texas County)
 Rolla 31 Public Schools
 Saint James R-1 School District (also extends into Maries County)

Pulaski County

 Crocker R-II School District
 Dixon R-I School District (also extends into Maries County)
 Laquey R-V School District
 Richland R-IV School District
 Swedeborg R-III School District
 Waynesville R-VI School District

Reynolds County

 Bunker R-III School District (Dent, Reynolds and Shannon Counties)
 Centerville R-I School District
 Lesterville R-IV School District
 Southern Reynolds Co R-II School District

Shannon County

 Eminence R-I School District
 Winona R-III School District

Texas County

 Cabool R-IV School District (also extends into Douglas County)
 Houston R-I School District
 Licking R-VIII School District
 Plato R-V School District (also extends into Laclede, Pulaski, and Wright counties)
 Raymondville R-VII School District
 Success School District R-VI
 Summersville R-II School District

Washington County

 Kingston K-14 School District (also extends into Jefferson County)
 Potosi R-3 School District
 Richwoods R-VII School District
 Valley R-VI School District

Region H: Northwest Region

Andrew County

 Avenue City R-IX School District
 North Andrew County R-VI School District
 Savannah R-III School District

Atchison County

 Fairfax R-III School District 
 Rock Port R-II School District
 Tarkio R-I School District

Buchanan County

 Buchanan County R-IV School District 
 East Buchanan County C-1 School District
 Mid-Buchanan County R-V School District
 Saint Joseph School District

Caldwell County

 Braymer C-4 School District (also extends into Carroll, Ray and Livingston Counties)
 Breckenridge R-I School District (also extends into Daviess and Livingston Counties)
 Cowgill R-VI School District
 Hamilton R-II School District
 Kingston 42 School District
 Mirabile C-1 School District
 New York R-IV School District
 Polo R-VII School District

Clinton County

 Cameron R-I School District (also extends into Caldwell, Davies and Dekalb Counties)
 Clinton County R-III School District (also extends into Clay County)
 Lathrop R-II School District

Daviess County

 Gallatin R-V School District
 North Daviess R-III School District
 Pattonsburg R-II School District
 Tri-County R-VII School District
 Winston R-VI School District

DeKalb County

 Maysville R-I School District
 Osborn R-0 School District
 Stewartsville C-2 School District
 Union Star R-II School District

Gentry County

 Albany R-III School District
 King City R-I School District
 Stanberry R-II School District

Grundy County

 Grundy County R-V School District
 Laredo R-VII School District 
 Pleasant View R-VI School District
 Spickard R-II School District
 Trenton R-IX School District

Harrison County

 Cainsville R-I School District (also extends into Mercer County)
 Gilman City R-IV School District
 North Harrison R-III School District
 Ridgeway R-V School District
 South Harrison Co. R-II School District

Holt County

 Craig R-III School District
 Mound City R-II School District
 South Holt Co. R-I School District

Livingston County

 Chillicothe R-II School District
 Livingston County R-III School District
 Southwest Livingston County R-I School District

Mercer County

 North Mercer County R-III School District
 Princeton R-V School District

Nodaway County

 Jefferson C-123 School District
 Maryville R-II School District
 Nodaway-Holt R-VII School District
 North Nodaway County R-VI School District
 Northeast Nodaway County R-V School District
 South Nodaway Co. R-IV School District
 West Nodaway County R-I School District

Worth County
 Worth County R-III School District

Region I: Northeast Region

Adair County

 Adair County R-I School District
 Adair County R-II School District (also extends into Knox County)
 Kirksville R-III School District

Chariton County

 Brunswick R-II School District (also extends into Saline County)
 Keytesville R-III School District
 Northwestern R-I School District
 Salisbury R-IV School District

Clark County
 Clark County R-I School District

Knox County
 Knox Co. R-I School District

Lewis County

 Canton R-V School District
 Lewis County C-1 School District

Linn County

 Brookfield R-III School District (also extends into Chariton County)
 Bucklin R-II School District (also extends into Macon County)
 Linn County R-I School District (also extends into Sullivan County)
 Marceline R-V School District
 Meadville R-IV School District

Macon County

 Atlanta C-3 School District (also extends into Shelby County)
 Bevier C-4 School District 
 Callao C-8 School District
 La Plata R-II School District
 Macon County R-I School District
 Macon County R-IV School District

Marion County

 Hannibal 60 School District
 Marion County R-II School District 
 Palmyra R-1 School District

Monroe County

 Holliday C-2 School District
 Madison C-3 School District
 Middle Grove C-1 School District
 Monroe City R-I School District
 Paris R-II School District

Pike County

 Boncl R-X School District
 Bowling Green R-I School District (also extends into Ralls County)
 Louisiana R-II School District
 Pike County R-III School District

Putnam County
 Putnam County R-I School District

Ralls County
 Ralls County R-II School District

Randolph County

 Higbee R-VIII School District
 Moberly School District
 Northeast Randolph County R-IV School District
 Renick R-V School District
 Westran R-I School District

Schuyler County
 Schuyler County R-I School District

Scotland County

 Scotland Co. R-I School District

Shelby County

 North Shelby School District
 Shelby County R-IV School District

Sullivan County

 Green City R-I School District
 Milan C-2 School District
 Newtown-Harris R-III School District

References

External links
 Missouri Department of Elementary and Secondary Education

School districts
Missouri
School districts